John Terrence Lynch Jr. (born September 25, 1971) is an American professional football executive and former player who is the general manager of the San Francisco 49ers of the National Football League (NFL). He played in the NFL as a strong safety for 15 seasons, primarily with the Tampa Bay Buccaneers. A nine-time Pro Bowl selection, Lynch earned a Super Bowl ring with the Buccaneers in Super Bowl XXXVII. He was inducted into the Pro Football Hall of Fame in 2021. 

Lynch played college football for the Stanford Cardinal and was selected by Tampa Bay in the third round of the 1993 NFL Draft. He also spent four seasons with the Denver Broncos before retiring from playing in 2008. After the end of his playing career, Lynch worked in the broadcasting booth as a color commentator for NFL on Fox games and remained doing so until his hiring as general manager of the 49ers in 2017.

Early years
Lynch was born in Hinsdale, Illinois. He attended Torrey Pines High School in the Carmel Valley/Del Mar area of San Diego, California, where he played football, baseball, and basketball.

College career
Lynch starred in baseball and football at Stanford University. He played football under head coach Dennis Green and played his senior season under Bill Walsh. Lynch began his football career at Stanford as a  backup quarterback but transitioned to safety before his junior season. Lynch planned on pursuing baseball after he was drafted by the Florida Marlins and head coach Dennis Green accepted the head coaching position with the Minnesota Vikings in 1992. Bill Walsh was hired as Stanford's new head coach and called Lynch in order to convince him to return for his senior season.  “You were the best defensive player on the field,” Lynch recalled Walsh telling him. “I would love to have you back. You could play [safety] at the Pro-Bowl level.”

In his senior season, Lynch recorded 76 tackles and 4 interceptions, which he returned for 62 yards and a touchdown.  Stanford went 10-3 that year, only the second 10-win season in school history, with a final ranking of #9 in the nation and concluded the year with a 24-3 win over Penn State in the Blockbuster Bowl.

Baseball career
Lynch was drafted as a right-handed pitcher by the Florida Marlins in the second round (66th overall) of the 1992 Major League Baseball draft. He threw the first pitch in the organization's history as a member of the Erie Sailors; thus, his jersey with the Sailors is in the Baseball Hall of Fame. He played two seasons in the minor leagues with the Sailors and the Kane County Cougars, starting nine games and going 1–3 with a 2.35 earned run average.

Football career

Tampa Bay Buccaneers
The Tampa Bay Buccaneers selected Lynch in the third round (82nd pick overall) of the 1993 NFL Draft. Lynch was the sixth safety drafted in 1993.

1993 season: Rookie year
On May 15, 1993, the Buccaneers signed Lynch to a two-year, $526,750 contract.

Lynch began his rookie season as a special teams player. He made his NFL regular-season debut and first NFL start in the season-opener against the Kansas City Chiefs and recorded a tackle during their 27–3 loss. On November 14, 1993, Lynch earned his third start of the season, replacing Marty Carter at strong safety. During Week 11, Lynch recorded a season-high six combined tackles during a 45–21 loss against the San Francisco 49ers. He was demoted back to behind the backup strong safety after Week 12.

Lynch finished his rookie season with ten combined tackles and two forced fumbles in 15 games and four starts.

1994 season
Lynch remained as a backup strong safety under head coach Sam Wyche in 1994. In Week 11, he collected a season-high four combined tackles in a 14–9 road loss to the Detroit Lions.

Lynch finished his second professional season with 16 combined tackles in 16 games and no starts.

1995 season
Lynch competed against Barney Bussey to be the starting strong safety after it was left vacant by the departure of Marty Carter. Head coach Sam Wyche named Lynch the backup strong safety behind Barney Bussey to begin the regular season. During Week 6, Lynch recorded two combined tackles and made his first NFL interception during a 19–16 victory over the Cincinnati Bengals in Week 6. Lynch made his first career interception off a pass attempt by Bengals quarterback Jeff Blake, that was intended for wide receiver Darnay Scott, in the fourth quarter. In the next game against the Minnesota Vikings, Lynch earned the job as the starting strong safety and had his breakout performance during the 20–17 victory, collecting a season-high 11 combined tackles (six solo), deflecting two passes, and making two interceptions off of Vikings quarterback Warren Moon. His attributes his performance to knowing Vikings head coach Dennis Green's impulses from playing under him at Stanford and studying Moon's tendencies. Lynch remained the starting strong safety for the remainder of the season but was inactive for three games (Weeks 12–14) due to an injury. On December 27, 1995, the Buccaneers announced their decision to fire head coach Sam Wyche after they finished with a 7–9 record in 1995.

Lynch finished the 1995 season with 38 combined tackles and three interceptions in nine games and six starts.

1996 season
On January 23, 1996, the Buccaneers named Minnesota Vikings defensive coordinator Tony Dungy to be their new head coach. Dungy and defensive coordinator Monte Kiffin devised a Cover 2 defense that became known as the Tampa 2. Throughout training camp, Lynch competed against Todd Scott to retain his role as the starting strong safety. Lynch was sidelined for the first two preseason games due to a rib injury. Head coach Tony Dungy named Lynch the backup strong safety, behind Todd Scott, to begin the regular season.

On September 8, 1996, Todd Scott tore his Achilles tendon and was sidelined for the remainder of the season. Lynch subsequently became the starting strong safety and played alongside Melvin Johnson. In Week 8, he collected five combined tackles and made his first NFL sack on quarterback Kent Graham for a five-yard loss in the fourth quarter of a 13–9 road loss to the Arizona Cardinals. In the next game, he recorded eight combined tackles and intercepted a pass by Packers quarterback Brett Favre during a 13–7 road loss to the Green Bay Packers. During Week 13, Lynch recorded four combined tackles, forced a fumble, and an interception during a 13–7 over victory against the New Orleans Saints. He intercepted a pass by Saints quarterback Jim Everett to seal the victory with 4:45 remaining.

Lynch finished the 1996 season with 100 combined tackles, three interceptions, two forced fumbles, and a sack in 16 games and 14 starts.

1997 season
On September 5, 1997, the Buccaneers signed Lynch to a four-year, $6.8 million contract.

Head coach Tony Dungy retained Lynch as the starting strong safety to begin the regular season. He began the season starting alongside free safety Melvin Johnson. On September 19, 1997, Lynch received a $7,500 fine from the league for an illegal hit on Vikings wide receiver Chris Walsh while he was out of bounds. This became his second fine in the first three games as he also received a $5,000 fine for an illegal hit on 49ers running back William Floyd during the season-opener. In Week 9, he collected a season-high 13 combined tackles as the Buccaneers lost 10–6 against the Minnesota Vikings. He started in all 16 games in 1997 and recorded 110 combined tackles, two interceptions, and forced a fumble. Lynch was named to the 1998 Pro Bowl, marking the first Pro Bowl selection in the first five years of his career.

The Buccaneers finished second in the NFC Central with a 10–6 record and earned a wildcard berth. On December 28, 1997, Lynch started in his first career playoff game and recorded eight combined tackles as the Buccaneers defeated the Detroit Lions by a score of 20–10 in the NFC Wildcard Game. The following week, he made three combined tackles during a 21–7 road loss to the Green Bay Packers in the NFC Divisional Round.

1998 season
In 1998, Lynch started alongside free safety Charles Mincy and cornerbacks Ronde Barber and Donnie Abraham. In Week 5, he collected a season-high 13 combined tackles during a 20–3 victory against the New York Giants. Lynch was inactive for the Week 10 loss to the Tennessee Oilers due to a neck injury. On December 13, 1998, Lynch recorded three combined tackles and made two interceptions as the Buccaneers defeated the Pittsburgh Steelers 16–3. Lynch made both interceptions off of pass attempts by Steelers quarterback Kordell Stewart. In Week 16, Lynch made six combined tackles, a season-high two sacks, and forced a fumble during a 20–16 road loss to the Washington Redskins. He sacked Redskins quarterback Trent Green for a 14-yard loss and forced a fumble that was recovered by teammate Steve White in the first quarter.

Lynch finished the 1998 NFL season with 85 combined tackles, two interceptions, two sacks, and a forced fumble in 15 games and starts.

1999 season
Lynch returned as the starter and played alongside free safety Damien Robinson in 1999. In Week 10, Lynch collected a season-high 12 combined tackles and forced a fumble during a season debut 17–10 win against the Kansas City Chiefs. Lynch started in all 16 games in 1997 and recorded 116 combined tackles, two interceptions, forced a fumble, and was credited with half a sack. Lynch was named first-team A.P. All-Pro and was also selected to play in the 2000 Pro Bowl.

The Tampa Bay Buccaneers finished atop the NFC Central Division with an 11–5 record and earned a first-round bye. On January 15, 2000, Lynch recorded eight combined tackles and intercepted a pass by Redskins quarterback Brad Johnson during a 14–13 victory over the Washington Redskins in the NFC Divisional Round. The following week, Lynch recorded three tackles as the Buccaneers lost 11–6 at the St. Louis Rams in the NFC Championship Game.

2000 season
On September 11, 2000, the Buccaneers signed Lynch to a six-year, $24 million contract extension that included $5.6 million guaranteed. Head coach Tony Dungy retained the starting secondary from the previous season, including safeties Lynch and Damien Robinson and cornerbacks Ronde Barber and Donnie Abraham. In Week 6, he collected a season-high ten combined tackles during a 30–23 loss at the Minnesota Vikings. Lynch started in all 16 games in 2000 and recorded 94 combined tackles, three interceptions, and one sack.

2001 season
Head coach Tony Dungy named Lynch the starting strong safety to begin the sixth consecutive season. He started alongside free safety Dexter Jackson in 2001. During Week 5, Lynch collected a season-high 12 combined tackles (nine solo) during a 31–28 road loss to the Tennessee Titans.

Lynch finished the 2001 season with 87 combined tackles (62 solo), four pass deflections, three interceptions, and a sack in 16 games and starts. On January 2, 2002, it was announced that Lynch was selected to play in the 2002 Pro Bowl.

2002 season
On January 14, 2002, the Buccaneers fired head coach Tony Dungy after they finished third in the NFC Central with a 9–7 record and lost to the Eagles for the second straight year in the playoffs. New head coach Jon Gruden retained defensive coordinator Monte Kiffin and defensive backs coach Mike Tomlin. He also retained Lynch and Dexter Jackson as the starting safeties alongside cornerbacks Ronde Barber and Brian Kelly.

During Week 7, Lynch collected a season-high eight combined tackles during a 20–10 road loss to the Philadelphia Eagles. In the next game, he recorded three combined tackles, deflected three passes, and made two interceptions in a 12–9 road victory over the Carolina Panthers. Lynch intercepted both passes off Panthers quarterback Randy Fasani.

Lynch finished the 2002 season with 64 combined tackles (41 solo), five pass deflections, and three interceptions in 15 games and starts. The Buccaneers finished atop the NFC South with a 12–4 record and earned a first-round bye. The Buccaneers defeated the San Francisco 49ers 31–6 in the NFC Divisional Round. On January 19, 2003, Lynch recorded six solo tackles and broke up a pass during a 27–10 road victory over the Philadelphia Eagles in the NFC Championship Game. On January 26, 2003, Lynch started in Super Bowl XXXVII and made a tackle and pass deflection during the 48–21 victory against the Oakland Raiders.

2003 season
Head coach Jon Gruden named Lynch the starting strong safety to begin the regular season, alongside free safety Dwight Smith. During Week 2, Lynch collected a season-high 11 combined tackles (seven solo) during a 12–9 loss to the Carolina Panthers. He was inactive for two games (Weeks 8–9) due to a shoulder injury. Lynch finished the season with 72 combined tackles (50 solo), six pass deflections, two interceptions, and was credited with half a sack in 14 games and starts.

On March 12, 2004, the Buccaneers released Lynch in a salary cap-related maneuver. He offered to take a significant pay cut to remain with the team, but the offer was rebuffed.

Denver Broncos

On March 22, 2004, the Denver Broncos signed Lynch to a three-year, $9 million contract as an unrestricted free agent. He signed a free agent contract with the Broncos despite being courted by the two-time defending Super Bowl Champion New England Patriots. Lynch also received an offer from the New York Jets, but opted not to reunite with head coach Herm Edwards who has previously been his defensive backs coach with the Buccaneers.

In the 2005 season, Lynch nearly made his second Super Bowl after the Broncos defeated the Patriots in the Divisional Round, but they lost to the Pittsburgh Steelers in the AFC Championship Game.

Lynch served as the Broncos' defensive captain in 2006 and 2007. On July 31, 2008, he was granted his release by the Broncos. Lynch said in a news conference that his lack of playing time heading into this season was a reason for his departure.

New England Patriots
Lynch visited with the New England Patriots on August 13, 2008, then agreed to a one-year deal worth $1.5 million. However, on September 1, 2008, he was released.

Retirement
On November 17, 2008, Lynch announced his retirement from football.

NFL career statistics

Regular season

Postseason

Broadcasting career
On November 23, 2008, Lynch joined NFL on Fox in the broadcasting booth as a color commentator, and was paired with Chris Rose and Kevin Burkhardt.

Lynch was officially inducted into the Broncos Ring of Fame on October 23, 2016, in a ceremony at Sports Authority Field at Mile High, joining kicker Jason Elam and linebacker Simon Fletcher in the class of 2016. A month later, he was inducted into the Buccaneers Ring of Honor in a ceremony at Raymond James Stadium.

Executive career

San Francisco 49ers
On January 29, 2017, Lynch was named the general manager of the San Francisco 49ers.

On January 16, 2020, Lynch was named as the Pro Football Writers Association 2019 NFL Executive of the Year after the 49ers finished atop the NFC West with a 13–3 record.

Personal life
Lynch is married to Linda Allred, the older sister of his close friend and former NFL tight end John Allred. He and Allred had a run-in during a 1997 NFL game that resulted in Allred almost getting knocked out from a hit.  His father, John Lynch Sr., is a retired radio executive in San Diego, a founder of the sports talk station XEPRS-AM 1090. His son Jake Lynch currently plays football at Stanford.

References

External links
 John Lynch Foundation

John Lynch: An Oral History, Stanford Historical Society Oral History Program, 2010

1971 births
Living people
American Conference Pro Bowl players
American football safeties
College football announcers
Denver Broncos players
Erie Sailors players
Kane County Cougars players
National Conference Pro Bowl players
National Football League announcers
New England Patriots players
People from Hinsdale, Illinois
Players of American football from Illinois
Players of American football from San Diego
San Francisco 49ers executives
Sportspeople from Cook County, Illinois
Sportspeople from the Chicago metropolitan area
Stanford Cardinal baseball players
Stanford Cardinal football players
Tampa Bay Buccaneers players
Ed Block Courage Award recipients